Tanjong Maya Secondary School is a government secondary school in Tutong, Brunei. The school provides secondary education leading up to GCE 'O' Level and IGCSE qualifications.

See also 
 List of secondary schools in Brunei

Secondary schools in Brunei
Cambridge schools in Brunei